Guy Roger Nzamba (born 13 July 1970) is a Gabonese former professional footballer, who played as a forward. He represented the Gabon national team between 1988 and 2000, scoring 21 goals in 52 matches.

Career
Nzamba made his debut in the Football League for Southend United on 20 September 1997, at home to Fulham in the 1–0 victory. He came on as a substitute in the 40th minute for Paul Williams before being substituted himself in the 65th minute for Carl Beeston.

He also represented the Gabon national team on a number of occasions.

References

External links

Living people
1970 births
People from Ogooué-Maritime Province
Association football forwards
Gabonese footballers
Gabon international footballers
Ligue 1 players
Ligue 2 players
Serie C players
English Football League players
AJ Auxerre players
FC Mulhouse players
Angers SCO players
U.S. Triestina Calcio 1918 players
K.V. Kortrijk players
Southend United F.C. players
FC 105 Libreville players
1994 African Cup of Nations players
1996 African Cup of Nations players
Gabonese expatriate footballers
Expatriate footballers in France
Expatriate footballers in England
Expatriate footballers in Belgium
Expatriate footballers in Italy
Gabonese expatriate sportspeople in France
Gabonese expatriate sportspeople in Belgium
Gabonese expatriate sportspeople in the United Kingdom
Gabonese expatriate sportspeople in Italy
21st-century Gabonese people